Lorenzo is a city in Crosby County, Texas, United States. As of the 2010 census, the city population was 1,147, down from 1,372 in 2000. It is part of the Lubbock Metropolitan Statistical Area.

Geography

Lorenzo is located in western Crosby County at  (33.671618, –101.536233) on U.S. Routes 62 and 82 and State Highways 114 and 378.

Economy
The local economy is supported by agriculture, with cotton being the most important crop. Wheat, soybeans, milo, and various other crops are also produced in the Lorenzo area.

Demographics

2020 census

As of the 2020 United States census, there were 964 people, 346 households, and 254 families residing in the city.

2000 census
As of the census of 2000, 1,372 people, 472 households, and 353 families resided in the city. The population density was 1,329.3 people per square mile (514.3/km). The 525 housing units averaged 508.7 per square mile (196.8/km). The racial makeup of the city was 64.65% White, 6.63%African American, 1.24% Native American, 0.07% Asian, 25.15% from other races, and 2.26% from two or more races. Hispanics or Latinos of any race were 54.01% of the population.

Of the 472 households, 36.7% had children under the age of 18 living with them, 57.4% were married couples living together, 13.6% had a female householder with no husband present, and 25.2% were not families. About 23.5% of all households were made up of individuals, and 11.2% had someone living alone who was 65 years of age or older. The average household size was 2.91 and the average family size was 3.48.

In the city, the population was distributed as 32.1% under the age of 18, 9.5% from 18 to 24, 24.7% from 25 to 44, 20.3% from 45 to 64, and 13.3% who were 65 years of age or older. The median age was 32 years. For every 100 females, there were 97.4 males. For every 100 females age 18 and over, there were 88.7 males.

The median income for a household in the city was $24,438, and for a family was $31,429. Males had a median income of $23,646 versus $19,250 for females. The per capita income for the city was $11,606. About 25.9% of families and 35.6% of the population were below the poverty line, including 45.4% of those under age 18 and 22.3% of those age 65 or over.

Education
The city is served by the Lorenzo Independent School District and is home to the Lorenzo High School Hornets.

Climate
According to the Köppen climate classification system, Lorenzo has a semiarid climate, BSk on climate maps.

References

External links
 City of Lorenzo official website
 History of Lorenzo from The Handbook of Texas Online

Cities in Texas
Cities in Crosby County, Texas
Lubbock metropolitan area